Giuseppe Errante (March 19, 1760 – February 16, 1821) was an Italian painter.

He was born in Trapani, Sicily. A local priest obtained for him an apprenticeship in the studio of a local sculptor, Domenico Nolfo. In 1760, Errante studied in Palermo under Gioacchino Martorana. By 1784, he had moved to Rome with the support of Antonio Canova. By 1791, he was employed in the Caserta Palace, Naples. In Naples, he met Jacob Philipp Hackert. On account of his political intrigues, he was obliged to flee Naples.

After a number of travails, he arrived in Milan in 1795, and afterwards established himself at Rome in 1810. Besides historical subjects, he painted portraits, in which he was especially successful. He died in Rome in 1821.

Francesco Cancellieri wrote a posthumous biography of the painter in 1824. Among his pupils in Rome was Giuseppe Gandolfo and in Sicily Giuseppe Mazzarese.

References

Attribution:
 

1760 births
1821 deaths
18th-century Italian painters
Italian male painters
19th-century Italian painters
Painters from Sicily
People from Trapani
19th-century Italian male artists
18th-century Italian male artists